Dighton may refer to a location in the United States:

 Dighton, Kansas
 Dighton, Massachusetts

Surname
 John Dighton (1909–1989), British playwright and screenwriter
 Robert Dighton (1752–1812) English portrait painter, printmaker and caricaturist
 Robert Dighton (MP), English politician

See also
 Deighton (disambiguation)